Victoria Adams may refer to:

Victoria Adams (comics), fictional superheroine known as the Shield
Victoria Gray Adams (1926–2006), civil rights activist 
Victoria Beckham (born 1974), née Adams, English pop singer and businesswoman
Vicki Chalmers (born 1989), née Adams, Scottish curler
Mickie James (born 1979), American wrestler, sometimes uses the ring name Vicki Adams
Victoria Adams (1878–1943), wife of inventor Leon Douglass
 Victoria Adams (aka Muriel Montossé or Muriel Montossey)(born 1955) French actress who appeared in films directed by Jesús Franco

See also
Adams (surname)
Victoria (given name)